Li Daoyu (born 1932) is a Chinese retired diplomat who served as the Chinese Ambassador to the United States between 1993 and 1998.

Early life 
In Aug 1932, Li was born in Hefei, Anhui province, China.

Education 
Li graduated from the University of Shanghai in 1952.

Career 
In 1952, Li entered the foreign ministry of PRC. From 1952 to 1983, he was an official of the international section of the Ministry and was promoted to vice section chief. In 1983, Li became the vice delegate to Geneva. From 1984 to 1988, Li served as the international section chief of the foreign ministry. In 1988, he became the assistant to the Foreign Minister. From 1990 to 1993, he was the delegate and ambassador to United Nations. From 1993 to 1998, Li served as the PRC's ambassador to the United States. From 1998, Li served in the National People's Congress until his retirement in 2004.

References

Ambassadors of China to the United States
Permanent Representatives of the People's Republic of China to the United Nations
1932 births
Living people
Nanyang Model High School alumni
University of Shanghai alumni
Diplomats of the People's Republic of China